Michael Branch may refer to:

 Michael Branch (academic) (1940–2019), British linguist and academic administrator
 Michael Branch (footballer) (born 1978), English footballer 
 Mike Branch (born 1965), Louisiana state senator
 Michael P. Branch (born 1963), American ecocritic, writer, and humorist